Frank "Frankie the Butcher" Bonsangue is an American film, stage and television actor. He is also a television personality on several cooking shows including the Food Network's "Hot off the Grill Show with Bobby Flay". He has appeared in Spider-Man 2, Analyze That and Law & Order.

Early life
Frank was born in Astoria, Queens, New York.

Career
Before turning to acting, Bonsangue worked in the food business at his family-owned meat market in Greenwich Village, then at the Waldorf Astoria Hotel. He has studied acting at the Stella Adler Acting Conservatory, the Michael Howard Studios and the Young Actors Workshop.

He voice Phil Bell in a best popular video game Grand Theft Auto IV.

Filmography

External links

Official site
Frankie the Butcher YouTube channel

American male television actors
American male film actors
Year of birth missing (living people)
American male stage actors
Living people
People from Astoria, Queens